Guarea sphenophylla is a species of plant in the family Meliaceae. It is found in the Dominican Republic and Haiti.

References

sphenophylla
Flora of Haiti
Flora of the Dominican Republic
Taxonomy articles created by Polbot